Artem Olehovych Yarmolenko (born 18 January 1998) is a Ukrainian football player.

Club career
He made his Ukrainian Premier League debut for FC Chornomorets Odesa on 23 July 2018 in a game against FC Olimpik Donetsk.

In November 2018, it was announced that he tested positive for ostarine in August 2018 and was suspended from playing.

References

External links
 
 

1998 births
Footballers from Kyiv
Living people
Ukrainian footballers
Ukraine youth international footballers
Association football defenders
FC Dynamo Kyiv players
U.D. Leiria players
FC Chornomorets Odesa players
FC Ahrobiznes Volochysk players
Campeonato de Portugal (league) players
Ukrainian Premier League players
Ukrainian expatriate footballers
Expatriate footballers in Portugal
Ukrainian expatriate sportspeople in Portugal
Ukrainian sportspeople in doping cases
Doping cases in association football